Serjão (meaning "big Sergio" in Portuguese) is a nickname of people with given name Sergio and may refer to:
Sérgio Luis Gardino da Silva (born 1979), Brazilian footballer 
Sérgio Ricardo de Jesus Vertello (born 1975), Brazilian footballer
Sergio Luis Maciel Lucas (born 1979), Brazilian born Azerbaijani futsal player